The 2015 Cleveland Saints season was the first season for the American Indoor Football (AIF) expansion franchise, and their first season in the AIF.

Schedule

Regular season

Standings

Roster

References

Cleveland Saints
Cleveland Saints
Cleveland Saints